Aunat is a commune in the Aude department in the Occitanie region of southern France.

The inhabitants of the commune are known as Aunatois or Aunatoises.

Geography
Aunat is located some 60 km west by north-west of Perpignan and 25 km east by north-east of Ax-les-Thermes. Access to the commune is by the D20 road from Rodome in the west which passes through the village and continues east to Bessède-de-Sault. The D29 road comes from Fontanès-de-Sault in the south and passes through the length of the commune and the village before continuing north-west to join the D107 north-east of Belfort-sur-Rebenty. The commune is mostly rugged and forested but with farmland in the valley around the village.

The Ruisseau du Mouillou rises in the north-east of the commune and flows west gathering several tributaries from the north including the Ruisseau du Bernet and the Ruisseau de Valmajou before joining the Ruisseau de Romanis on the western border of the commune.

Neighbouring communes and villages

Heraldry

Administration

List of Successive Mayors

Demography
In 2017 the commune had 67 inhabitants.

Notable people linked to the commune
The paternal side of Edgar Faure originated from this commune for many generations before 1850.

See also
Communes of the Aude department

References

External links
Aunat on the old IGN website 
Aunat on Géoportail, National Geographic Institute (IGN) website 
Aunat on the 1750 Cassini Map

Communes of Aude